Bafana Freddy Sonakile is a South African advocate and politician. He has been a Member of the North West Provincial Legislature for the Democratic Alliance since May 2019. He is the party's chief whip and deputy provincial leader. Sonakile had previously worked as a legal advisor at the provincial legislature.

Early life and education
Sonakile was born in Zamdela, Sasolburg in the Orange Free State. He was raised by his mother. Sonakile obtained an LLB degree from the North-West University. He was then employed as a legal advisor at the North West Provincial Legislature. In 2018, Sonakile was one of the Mail & Guardian's 200 Young South Africans.

Political career
Sonakile is a member of the Democratic Alliance. After the 2019 provincial election, he returned to the provincial legislature, this time as a representative of the DA. He is one of four party representatives. The party's caucus elected him chief whip.

On 21 November 2020, Sonakile was elected deputy provincial leader of the DA in the North West, defeating Isaac Seitlholo.

References

External links

Living people
Year of birth missing (living people)
Members of the North West Provincial Legislature
Democratic Alliance (South Africa) politicians
21st-century South African politicians
People from Sasolburg
21st-century South African lawyers
North-West University alumni